Maya Krishna Rao (born 1953) is an Indian theatre artist, stand-up comedian and social activist. Her well-known plays include Om Swaha, Dafa No. 180, Ravanama and Heads Are Meant for Walking Into. She is a recipient of the Sangeet Natak Akademi Award (2010), which she returned five years later citing growth of intolerance in India.

Biography
Born in 1953 in New York City, Rao moved to India at a young age. She was inspired by her mother Bhanumathi Rao, who was associated with Malayalam theatre in the 1960s. Rao studied at Modern School, New Delhi. She completed her bachelor's degree from Miranda House, Delhi and received a Master's degree in political science from the  Jawaharlal Nehru University, Delhi. She also has a degree in theatre arts from the University of Leeds. During her stay in the United Kingdom, she was briefly associated with the "Perspectives Theatre Company" in Nottingham and the "Leeds Playhouse Theatre-in-Education Company".

Rao is a trained Kathakali artist; she received her training from Mampuzha Madhava Panicker and Sadanam Balakrishnan.

Right from her college days, Rao was deeply influenced by the left movement. She is a co-founder of "Theatre Union", a street theatre group. She was Associate Professor in the department of Acting at the National School of Drama, New Delhi, between 1985 and 1990. and continued as visiting faculty thereafter. In 2013 she was appointed professor at the Shiv Nadar University, Delhi where she designed and taught a post graduate Diploma programme, TEST (Theatre for Education and Social Transformation), a first-of-its-kind in any institute of higher education in India. 
Rao's plays are characterised by sociopolitical themes. Her earliest plays include, Om Swaha, a critique of dowry, and Dafa No. 180, a take on the Indian rape law. Her solo-artist plays include Ravanama, Are You Home Lady Macbeth?, A Deep Fried Jam and Heads Are Meant for Walking Into. Rao's 2017 play Quality Street, based on a short story by the Nigerian writer Chimamanda Adichie, received critical acclaim. Her 2012 play Walk was based on the 2012 Delhi gang rape.

Rao received the Sangeet Natak Akademi Award for her contribution to Indian theatre in 2010. Following the 2015 Dadri mob lynching incident, she returned the award citing "rising of intolerance" in India; she was the first artist to renounce the award.

She resides with her family in Delhi.

Plays
 Loose Woman
 Om Swaha
 Dafa No. 180
 Khol Do
 A Deep Fried Jam
 Heads Are Meant for Walking Into
 Quality Street
 The Non-Stop Feel Good Show
 Hand Over Fist – perspectives on masculinities
 Lady Macbeth Revisited
 Ravanama
 Walk
 Not in My Name

References

1953 births
Indian stage actresses
Indian women theatre directors
Jawaharlal Nehru University alumni
Alumni of the University of Leeds
Recipients of the Sangeet Natak Akademi Award
People from New York City
People from New Delhi
Living people
Indian women educators
Kathakali exponents
Indian women choreographers
Indian film choreographers
Indian stand-up comedians
Indian women comedians
Women humorists